Bridge Eyot also known as Bridge Ait is an island in the River Thames in England just above Maidenhead Bridge on the reach above Bray Lock, near Maidenhead, Berkshire. The island is owned by the Royal Borough of Windsor and Maidenhead.

The island is tree-covered and there is also a very small island between it and Grass Eyot just upstream.

References

See also
Islands in the River Thames

Islands of Berkshire
Islands of the River Thames
Royal Borough of Windsor and Maidenhead